Kheyrud Kenar Rural District is a rural district (dehestan) in the Central District of Nowshahr County, Mazandaran Province, Iran. At the 2006 census, its population was 32,041, in 8,567 families. The rural district has 27 villages.

References 

Rural Districts of Mazandaran Province
Nowshahr County